Sim Sang-jung (born 20 February 1959) is a South Korean politician and labor rights activist. She was one of the five major presidential candidates in the 2017 South Korean presidential election, running as the Justice Party's nominee. She again ran as the Justice Party's nominee in the 2022 South Korean presidential election, finishing in 3rd place.

She is currently a member of the 21st National Assembly. She was the leader of the Justice Party from 2015 to 2017 and 2019 to 2020.

Education and early career 
Sim obtained her bachelor's degree in education from Seoul National University. She switched degrees from history, with the aspiration to become a history teacher.

At the age of 21, she worked at a cassette tape factory where her days as a labor rights activist began. Sim was subsequently fired for mobilizing workers to demand higher wages and better meals. She "hopped from job to job" to earn a wage but continued her labor activism. In 1985, she was on the country's most wanted list for instigating labor strikes. She was on the list for 9 years, and married her husband, a fellow activist, during that time. She was formally charged for 'instigation of mass harm' and 'instigation of arson', and was sentenced to 1.5 years imprisonment, but a 2-year suspended sentence, soon after she became pregnant.

Political career 
Sim was first elected in 2004 in the 17th National Assembly as a member of the Democratic Labor Party. She won her first direct election in the 19th National Assembly as a member of the UPP with 49.37% of the votes in an area of Gyeonggi Goyang in 2012.

Following the disintegration of the Unified Progressive Party after the Park Geun-hye government's petition to the Constitutional Court of Korea for the UPP's alleged pro-North Korean views in 2013, Sim helped found and is the current leader of the Justice Party. She was elected party chair in 2015. Sim won another seat in the 20th National Assembly in 2016, again in an area of Goyang with 53% of the vote. In the 2020 election, she defeated Moon Myung-soon from Democratic Party and Lee Kyung-hwan from now-PPP, becoming the first four-term parliamentarian from a progressive party in Korea.

Political positions and ideology

Economy 
Her economic positions reflect the progressive platform of her party. This includes reforming chaebols (Korean conglomerates) so that hereditary succession is banned. Her key policy in the 2022 South Korean election was the proposal of a four-day work week, which has been described as "a revolutionary idea in a country where workers endure notoriously long hours".

Social issues 
Sim was the only major presidential candidate to openly support LGBT rights in South Korea.

National security 
Sim opposes the deployment of THAAD, a U.S. anti ballistics missile defense system, and supports a nuclear-free Korean Peninsula.

Feminism 
Sim self-identifies as a feminist. She has said that, "Sexism clearly exists in South Korean society". Polling in the 2022 South Korean presidential election suggested her strongest support came from women in their 20s. Vladimir Tikhonov, professor of Korean studies at the University of Oslo has said that some younger women consider her a hero for what he describes as being able to "articulate the women's rights agenda".

References

External links
Official website 

1959 births
Living people
Members of the National Assembly (South Korea)
Seoul National University alumni
South Korean LGBT rights activists
Liberalism in South Korea
People from Gyeonggi Province
Anti-nuclear activists
Democratic Labor Party (South Korea) politicians
New Progressive Party (South Korea) politicians
South Korean social democrats
South Korean feminists
South Korean progressives
Justice Party (South Korea) politicians
Justice Party (South Korea)
Workers' rights activists
Female members of the National Assembly (South Korea)